Christian Fernández Salas (born 15 October 1985) is a Spanish professional footballer who plays for CF Fuenlabrada mainly as a left back.

Club career
Born in Santander, Cantabria, Fernández was a product of hometown club Racing de Santander's youth academy, and he made his first-team debut on 7 January 2007 in a 2–0 away loss against Levante UD. During that season he appeared in a further ten La Liga games, scoring his first goal in a 5–4 home defeat of Athletic Bilbao three months later.

Midway through the 2007–08 campaign, Fernández was loaned alongside teammate Samuel San José to Segunda División strugglers UD Las Palmas, and both proved instrumental as the Canarians retained their status, with the former netting four goals.

Fernández had a breakthrough year in 2009–10, playing 29 league matches for Racing and scoring twice, including in a 3–1 win at CA Osasuna on 21 March 2010 as they eventually avoided relegation. After S.L. Benfica decided to recall László Sepsi from his loan he had virtually no competitor for his position, and helped his team to the semi-finals of the Copa del Rey, notably netting in a 3–2 away victory over AD Alcorcón (which had previously ousted Real Madrid), also the final aggregate score.

After the arrival of Domingo Cisma, Fernández's playing time became more limited, but he still totalled 38 appearances in his last two seasons (as either a left or centre-back), scoring four goals. Santander suffered relegation in 2012 and, on 9 July of that year, he signed a two-year contract with UD Almería of the second division.

On 29 December 2013, after being first choice in the Andalusians' return to the top flight but only a reserve subsequently, Fernández was released. On 7 February of the following year, aged 28, he moved abroad for the first time in his career, signing with Major League Soccer's D.C. United.

Fernández returned to his country on 6 July 2014, joining former club Las Palmas for three years. On 6 August 2015, he was loaned to fellow division two team SD Huesca for one year.

On 7 July 2016, Fernández signed a two-year deal with Real Oviedo in the second tier. On 14 July 2022, he moved to CF Fuenlabrada on a one-year contract.

Personal life
Ahead of the 2018–19 season, Fernández announced that we would wear a shirt with the name Bolaño in it, in honour to his father's second name.

References

External links
Racing Santander official profile 

1985 births
Living people
Spanish footballers
Footballers from Santander, Spain
Association football defenders
La Liga players
Segunda División players
Segunda División B players
Tercera División players
Rayo Cantabria players
Racing de Santander players
UD Las Palmas players
UD Almería players
SD Huesca footballers
Real Oviedo players
CF Fuenlabrada footballers
Major League Soccer players
D.C. United players
Spanish expatriate footballers
Expatriate soccer players in the United States
Spanish expatriate sportspeople in the United States